Garth E. Snow (born July 28, 1969) is an American former professional ice hockey goaltender and former general manager, president and alternate governor of the New York Islanders of the National Hockey League (NHL).

Drafted by the Quebec Nordiques in the sixth round of the 1987 NHL Entry Draft, Snow began his NHL career in the 1993–94 season, playing for the Nordiques, Vancouver Canucks, Pittsburgh Penguins and New York Islanders, with which he retired with after the 2005–06 season. He was inducted into the Rhode Island Hockey Hall of Fame in 2019.

Playing career
Snow was drafted by the Quebec Nordiques out of Mount Saint Charles Academy in the sixth round of the 1987 NHL Entry Draft. He went straight to the University of Maine for four years and for three straight years led the National Collegiate Athletic Association (NCAA) in wins. After helping lead the school to a 42–1–2 record and the NCAA Championship in 1993, he was named to the All-Tournament team. After spending the majority of 1993–94 playing for the United States national team, which included playing in the 1994 Winter Olympics, he turned to his professional career, seeing his first NHL action in five games for the Nordiques.

Snow recorded 32 wins in 62 games for the Cornwall Aces of the American Hockey League (AHL) during 1994–95. After the Quebec franchise relocated to Colorado, Snow was traded to the Philadelphia Flyers in exchange for two draft picks during the off-season. Snow backed up veteran Ron Hextall for over two seasons, alternating with Hextall during the Flyers' run to the Stanley Cup Finals in 1997, most notably playing in Game 2 of the Finals. Near the trade deadline in 1997–98, he was traded to the Vancouver Canucks for Sean Burke.

As a Canuck in 1998–99, he registered career highs in games played (65), wins (20) and shutouts (6). His workload was cut in half the following season and he signed with the Pittsburgh Penguins prior to 2000–01. His stay in Pittsburgh lasted one season as he signed with the New York Islanders in the off-season, playing for them for the rest of his career, primarily as a backup to veteran Chris Osgood and then youngster Rick DiPietro.

Throughout his career, Snow was the target of the league office on several occasions over his goaltending equipment, in particular his shoulder pads, which opposing teams accused of violating NHL rules on size. According to former teammate Michael Peca, Snow was one of the best trash-talkers around: "He's got such a wit and sense of humor like no other. Snow says things that will cut you without being rude or obnoxious." Snow was regarded as a respected leader both on and off the ice.

Executive career
On July 18, 2006, Snow officially confirmed his retirement and was named general manager of the New York Islanders following Neil Smith's dismissal after 41 days on the job. There was much criticism directed the Islanders' way for firing a Stanley Cup-winning general manager after such a short tenure in favor of Snow, who at the time of his hiring held no experience in management. Defenders of the organization pointed to Snow's master's degree in Administration and bachelor's degree in Business Administration from the University of Maine.

In Snow's first season as general manager, he earned praise for making moves to open up space under the salary cap and using the space to trade for Marc-André Bergeron, Richard Zedník and Ryan Smyth. Snow was named NHL Executive of the Year for 2006–07 by Sports Illustrated.

On November 15, 2010, Snow fired head coach Scott Gordon and promoted Jack Capuano to interim head coach after the Islanders suffered a poor record of 4–10–3 in their first 17 games of the 2010–11 season. Capuano went on to guide the Islanders to their first playoff series win since 1993 during the 2016 playoffs. On January 17, 2017, Snow fired Capuano and promoted Doug Weight to interim head coach in response to the Islanders' record of 17–17–8 through 42 games of the 2016–17 season, which was ranked last in the Eastern Conference at that time. Through the 2017–18 season, his tenure with the Islanders saw the team accrue 11 playoff wins.

On June 5, 2018, Snow's position as Islanders' general manager was terminated, although he remained with the organization through 2019.

Career statistics

Regular season and playoffs

International

Awards and honors

References

External links
 

1969 births
Living people
American men's ice hockey goaltenders
Bridgeport Sound Tigers players
Cornwall Aces players
American expatriate ice hockey players in Russia
Ice hockey people from Massachusetts
Ice hockey players at the 1994 Winter Olympics
Las Vegas Flash players
Maine Black Bears men's ice hockey players
National Hockey League executives
National Hockey League general managers
New York Islanders executives
New York Islanders players
Olympic ice hockey players of the United States
People from Wrentham, Massachusetts
Philadelphia Flyers players
Pittsburgh Penguins players
Quebec Nordiques draft picks
Quebec Nordiques players
SKA Saint Petersburg players
Vancouver Canucks players
Wilkes-Barre/Scranton Penguins players
NCAA men's ice hockey national champions
Mount Saint Charles Academy alumni
Ice hockey players from Massachusetts